Savage Pampas is a 1945 Argentine historical film directed by Lucas Demare and Hugo Fregonese and starring Francisco Petrone, Luisa Vehil and Domingo Sapelli. The film's sets were designed by Germán Gelpi. The film is set in the  nineteenth century in the Dry Pampas, when it represented a frontier between Argentinian-controlled territory and areas still largely inhabited by Indians before the Conquest of the Desert extended Argentine control southwards. In 1966,  Fregonese remade the film in English under the same title.

In a survey of the 100 greatest films of Argentine cinema carried out by the Museo del Cine Pablo Ducrós Hicken in 2000, the film reached the 24th position.

Synopsis
A tough captain of the Argentine Army doggedly battles a band of outlaws composed of a mixture of Indians and Argentine deserters.

Cast
 Francisco Petrone 
 Luisa Vehil
 Domingo Sapelli 
 Froilán Varela 
 María Esther Gamas 
 Judith Sulian 
 Roberto Fugazot 
 Margarita Corona 
 Juan Bono 
 María Concepción César 
 Pablo Cumo 
 Luis Otero 
 Jorge Molina Salas 
 Tito Alonso 
 René Múgica
 Pedro Codina 
 Aurelia Ferrer 
 Francisco García Garaba 
 Raúl Luar  
 José Ruzzo
 Rita Montero

References

Bibliography 
 Rist, Peter H. Historical Dictionary of South American Cinema. Rowman & Littlefield, 2014.

External links 

1945 films
Argentine war drama films
Argentine historical drama films
1940s war drama films
1940s historical drama films
1940s Spanish-language films
Films directed by Hugo Fregonese
Films directed by Lucas Demare
Films set in Argentina
Films set in the 19th century
Argentine black-and-white films
1940s Argentine films